Red is the second album from British indie rock band Guillemots. It was released on 24 March 2008 in the United Kingdom and reached number 9 in the UK Album Charts. The album release was preceded by the single "Get Over It" on 17 March.

Track listing

Also included is the video to Get Over It.

Production
Ida Maria provided backing vocals on the track "Words".

Album art
The album cover and inner sleeve were inspired by the René Magritte paintings Le chambre d'écoute ("The Listening Room"; 1953) and Le tombeau des lutteurs ("The Tomb of the Wrestlers"; 1961).

The image on the album cover was taken at Rockingham Motor Speedway in one of the circuit's pedestrian tunnels.

Certifications

References

2008 albums
Guillemots (band) albums
Polydor Records albums